Istana is an Indonesian and Malay word meaning "palace".

Notable Istanas
Istana Alam Shah, the official palace of the Sultan of Selangor
Istana Besar, 19th- and early 20th-century residence of the Sultan of Johor
Istana Bogor, one of the presidential palaces of Indonesia in Bogor, West Java; the former Netherland Indies Governor General residence
Istana Cipanas, one of presidential palaces of Indonesia in Cipanas, West Java 
Istana Kampong Glam, former residence of the Sultan of Johore in Singapore, currently the Malay Heritage Centre
Istana Maimun, the Sultanate of Deli palace, Medan, North Sumatra
Istana Melawati, the second national palace of the King of Malaysia, located in Putrajaya
Istana Merdeka and Istana Negara, Jakarta, the office of the President of Indonesia
Istana Negara, Kuala Lumpur, the official residence of the King of Malaysia
Istana Nurul Iman, the official residence of the Sultan of Brunei
Istana Pagarruyung, Tanah Datar, West Sumatra, Minangkabau Rumah Gadang style traditional palace
Istana Singapore, the official residence and office of the President of Singapore
Istana Tampaksiring, one of the presidential palaces of Indonesia in Tampak Siring, Gianyar, located 40 km from Denpasar, Bali

See also
Kraton (Indonesia)
The Astana (palace)
SsangYong Istana, a van

Malay words and phrases
Indonesian words and phrases